Tambacounda Department is one of the 45 departments of Senegal, and one of the four making up the Tambacounda Region. It formerly covered an area of 20,328 km² and in 2013 had an estimated population of 283,769. However in 2005 it was reduced in size to create the new Koumpentoum Department.

The department has one only urban commune, that of Tambacounda.

The rest of the department is divided into three arrondissements, which in turn are divided into rural districts (communautés rurales):
Koussanar Arrondissement:
 Koussanar
 Sinthiou Malème
Makacolibantang Arrondissement:
 Makacolibantang
 Niani Toucouleur
 Ndoga Babacar
Missirah Arrondissement:
 Dialacoto
 Missirah
 Néttéboulou

Historic Sites 
 Railway Station and Railway Hotel in Tambacounda
 The building housing the Prefecture in Tambacounda
 Tata (fortification) of Maba at Ndoungoussine
 Wells and historic remains at Ndoungoussine
 Megalithic site at Thiékène Boussoura
 Megalithic site at Kodiam
 Megalithic site at Saré Diouldé
 Megalithic site at Saré Sékourou

References

Departments of Senegal
Tambacounda Region